The 1981 European Cup was the 8th edition of the European Cup of athletics. It was the last edition to feature multiple stages of competition before being replaced by the promotion/relegation system since 1983.

The "A" Finals were held in Zagreb, Yugoslavia. The first two teams qualified for the 1981 IAAF World Cup.

"A" Final
Held in Zagreb on 15 and 16 August.

Team standings

Results summary

Men's events

Women's events

"B" Final
The winners qualified for the "A" final.

Men
Held on 1 and 2 August in Athens, Greece

Women
Held on 2 August in Pescara, Italy

Semifinals

Men
All semifinals were held on 4 and 5 July. First two teams qualified for the "A" final (plus Yugoslavia as the host). Places 3–4 (plus Greece as the host) qualified for the "B" final.

Semifinal 1
Held in Lille, France

Semifinal 2
Held in Helsinki, Finland

Semifinal 3
Held in Warsaw, Poland

Women
All semifinals were held on 5 July. First two teams qualified for the "A" final (plus Yugoslavia as the host). Places 3–4 qualified for the "B" final.

Semifinal 1
Held in Bodø, Norway

Semifinal 2
Held in Edinburgh, United Kingdom

Semifinal 3
Held in Frankfurt, West Germany

Preliminaries
First three teams advanced to the semifinals.

Held on 20 and 21 June in Esch-sur-Alzette, Luxembourg

Held on 20 June in Barcelona, Spain

References

External links
European Cup results (Men) from GBR Athletics
European Cup results (Women) from GBR Athletics

European Cup (athletics)
European Cup
1981 in Yugoslav sport
International athletics competitions hosted by Yugoslavia